Butterfield Township may refer to the following places in the United States:

 Butterfield Township, Michigan
 Butterfield Township, Minnesota